James "Jim"/"Jimmy" Jolley (c. 1876 – 9 September 1928) was an English professional rugby league footballer who played in the 1900s and 1910s, and coached in the 1900s and 1910s.

International honours
Jim Jolley won caps for England while at Runcorn RFC in 1908 against Wales, and in 1909 against Australia (2 matches), and won caps for Great Britain while at Runcorn RFC in 1908 against New Zealand (3 matches).

Only eighteen players have ever scored drop goals for Great Britain, they are; Tommy Bishop (3), Lee Crooks (1), Jonathan Davies (2), Bobbie Goulding (1), Ken Gowers (1), John Gray (1), Neil Holding (1), John Holmes (2), Syd Hynes (3), Jim Jolley (1), Sean Long (1), Roger Millward (1), Steve Nash (1), Harry Pinner (1), Garry Schofield (7), Paul Sculthorpe (2), Jim Sharrock (1), and Tony Smith (1).

Background
Jim Jolley made his début for Warrington on Saturday 1 September 1900, he scored his only try for Warrington against Oldham at Wilderspool Stadium, Warrington, and he played his last match for Warrington on Saturday 25 April 1903.

References

1870s births
1928 deaths
England national rugby league team players
English rugby league coaches
English rugby league players
Great Britain national rugby league team players
Leigh Leopards coaches
Leigh Leopards players
Place of birth missing
Rugby league five-eighths
Runcorn RFC players
Warrington Wolves players